Savegre is a district of the Quepos canton, in the Puntarenas province of Costa Rica.

Geography 
Savegre has an area of  km² and an elevation of  metres.

Villages
Administrative center of the district is the town of Matapalo.

Other villages are Dos Bocas, Guabas, Guápil, Hatillo Nuevo, Hatillo Viejo, Laguna, Nubes, Palma Quemada, Pasito, Paso, Paso Guanacaste, Platanillo, Playa Matapalo, Portalón, Punto de Mira, Salitral, Salsipuedes, San Andrés, Santo Domingo, Silencio, Tierras Morenas and Tres Piedras.

Demographics 

For the 2011 census, Savegre had a population of  inhabitants.

Transportation

Road transportation 
The district is covered by the following road routes:
 National Route 34
 National Route 243

References 

Districts of Puntarenas Province
Populated places in Puntarenas Province